The SDAX (German abbreviation for Small-Cap-deutsche Aktienindex) is a stock market index composed of 70 small and medium-sized companies in Germany. These so-called 'small caps' rank directly below the MDAX (mid-cap) shares in terms of order book volume and market capitalization. They are thus the 91st–160th largest publicly traded companies in Germany.

The index is based on prices generated in the electronic trading system Xetra.

Companies 
70 companies make up the index as of the quarterly review effective on 10 September 2020.

See also 
DAX
MDAX
TecDAX
ÖkoDAX

References

External links 
SDAX
Historical Index Composition

German stock market indices